John Sylvester Newman Jr. (born November 28, 1963) is an American former professional basketball player. A 6' 7" and  shooting guard/small forward, Newman starred at the University of Richmond, before going on to play in the National Basketball Association. In his 16 seasons (1986–2002) in the NBA, he was a member of the Cleveland Cavaliers, New York Knicks, Charlotte Hornets, New Jersey Nets, Milwaukee Bucks, Denver Nuggets, and Dallas Mavericks.

Amateur career
Born in Danville, Virginia, Newman attended George Washington High School in Danville, playing for the Eagles under local Hall of Fame coach Harry Johnson before going on to play college basketball at Richmond. Newman is a member of Kappa Alpha Psi fraternity.

Newman graduated from Richmond in 1986 as the school's all-time leader in points with 2,383.  He was known as an expert marksman in college, with a .532 career field goal percentage and .800 career free throw percentage mark.

Newman led Richmond twice to the NCAA Tournament. In the 1984 Tournament, Newman and the underdog, 12th-seeded Richmond Spiders upset the 5th-seeded Auburn Tigers, led by future Basketball Hall-of-Famer Charles Barkley, in the first round. They fell to the 4th-seeded Indiana Hoosiers in the 2nd round.  In the 1986 NCAA Tournament, Richmond was seeded 11th in the East region and lost in the first round to 6th-seeded Saint Joseph's.

After college, Newman was selected by the Cleveland Cavaliers in the 2nd round, with the 29th overall pick, of the 1986 NBA draft.

Professional career
The Cleveland Cavaliers' group of selections in the 1986 NBA Draft was one of the best ever for the franchise, and among the best for any team. In that draft, the Cavaliers acquired the rights to future All-Stars Mark Price, Brad Daugherty, and Ron Harper. Since Harper and Newman played the same position, Newman was forced to ride the bench during his rookie season.

Newman joined the New York Knicks for the 1987–1988 season, and slowly worked his way into the starting lineup.  Along with teammates Mark Jackson and Patrick Ewing, Newman lead the Knicks into the playoffs and averaged 19.0 ppg (including 35 points in game 3) in an opening round loss to the Boston Celtics. In 1988–89, Newman further grew into his role in the starting five. He averaged 16.0 ppg and led the Knicks to the NBA's Atlantic Division title.

After the 1989–90 season, Newman signed as a free agent with the Charlotte Hornets, an expansion franchise in its 3rd year of existence.

Newman was traded by the New Jersey Nets along with Stephon Marbury after the 2000–01 NBA season in exchange for Jason Kidd.

Newman scored 12,740 points in his NBA career.

Newman was inducted into the Virginia Sports Hall of Fame in 2011.

NBA career statistics

Regular season 

|-
| style="text-align:left;"| 
| style="text-align:left;"| Cleveland
| 59 || 0 || 10.7 || .411 || .045 || .868 || 1.2 || .5 || .3 || .1 || 5.0
|-
| style="text-align:left;"| 
| style="text-align:left;"| New York
| 77 || 25 || 20.6 || .435 || .280 || .841 || 2.1 || .8 || .9 || .1 || 10.0
|-
| style="text-align:left;"| 
| style="text-align:left;"| New York
| 81 || 80 || 28.8 || .475 || .338 || .815 || 2.5 || 2.0 || 1.4 || .3 || 16.0
|-
| style="text-align:left;"| 
| style="text-align:left;"| New York
| 80 || 69 || 28.5 || .476 || .317 || .799 || 2.4 || 2.3 || 1.2 || .3 || 12.9
|-
| style="text-align:left;"| 
| style="text-align:left;"| Charlotte
| 81 || 81 || 30.6 || .470 || .357 || .809 || 3.1 || 2.3 || 1.2 || .2 || 16.9
|-
| style="text-align:left;"| 
| style="text-align:left;"| Charlotte
| 55 || 55 || 30.0 || .477 || .283 || .766 || 3.3 || 2.7 || 1.3 || .3 || 15.3
|-
| style="text-align:left;"| 
| style="text-align:left;"| Charlotte
| 64 || 27 || 23.0 || .522 || .267 || .808 || 2.2 || 1.8 || .7 || .3 || 11.9
|-
| style="text-align:left;"| 
| style="text-align:left;"| Charlotte
| 18 || 18 || 23.8 || .523 || .250 || .814 || 3.2 || 1.6 || 1.0 || .3 || 13.0
|-
| style="text-align:left;"|  
| style="text-align:left;"| New Jersey
| 63 || 0 || 20.1 || .453 || .270 || .807 || 1.9 || .7 || .8 || .3 || 9.5
|-
| style="text-align:left;"| 
| style="text-align:left;"| Milwaukee
| 82 || 11 || 23.1 || .463 || .352 || .801 || 2.1 || 1.1 || .8 || .2 || 7.7
|-
| style="text-align:left;"| 
| style="text-align:left;"| Milwaukee
| 82 || 82 || 32.8 || .495 || .377 || .802 || 2.4 || 1.9 || 1.1 || .2 || 10.8
|-
| style="text-align:left;"| 
| style="text-align:left;"| Milwaukee
| 82 || 4 || 25.1 || .450 || .347 || .765 || 2.3 || 1.4 || .9 || .2 || 8.7
|-
| style="text-align:left;"| 
| style="text-align:left;"| Denver
| 74 || 15 || 29.4 || .431 || .343 || .820 || 1.9 || 1.9 || 1.0 || .3 || 14.7
|-
| style="text-align:left;"| 
| style="text-align:left;"| Cleveland
| 50 || 2 || 19.0 || .422 || .377 || .810 || 1.5 || .8 || .6 || .2 || 6.1
|-
| style="text-align:left;"| 
| style="text-align:left;"| New Jersey
| 82 || 9 || 21.5 || .446 || .379 || .838 || 1.9 || .8 || .6 || .1 || 10.0
|-
| style="text-align:left;"| 
| style="text-align:left;"| New Jersey
| 82 || 17 || 25.0 || .419 || .335 || .855 || 2.1 || 1.4 || .8 || .1 || 10.9
|-
| style="text-align:left;"| 
| style="text-align:left;"| Dallas
| 47 || 17 || 15.4 || .453 || .386 || .724 || 1.0 || .3 || .6 || .1 || 4.2
|- class="sortbottom"
| style="text-align:center;" colspan="2"| Career
| 1,159 || 512 || 24.5 || .461 || .336 || .810 || 2.2 || 1.5 || .9 || .2 || 11.0

Playoffs 

|-
| style="text-align:left;"| 1988
| style="text-align:left;"| New York
| 4 || 2 || 28.3 || .456 || .000 || .875 || 2.8 || 1.8 || 1.5 || .3 || 19.0
|-
| style="text-align:left;"| 1989
| style="text-align:left;"| New York
| 9 || 9 || 28.7 || .467 || .250 || .776 || 2.8 || 1.9 || .9 || .1 || 16.1
|-
| style="text-align:left;"| 1990
| style="text-align:left;"| New York
| 10 || 0 || 23.1 || .447 || .400 || .755 || 2.1 || 1.0 || .9 || .3 || 11.7
|-
| style="text-align:left;"| 1993
| style="text-align:left;"| Charlotte
| 9 || 9 || 19.2 || .509 || .200 || .688 || 2.1 || 2.0 || 1.1 || .1 || 7.6
|-
| style="text-align:left;"| 1994
| style="text-align:left;"| New Jersey
| 4 || 0 || 13.5 || .231 || .250 || .714 || 1.3 || .5 || .5 || .5 || 3.0
|-
| style="text-align:left;"| 2002
| style="text-align:left;"| Dallas
| 3 || 2 || 7.3 || .143 || .167 || – || .0 || .7 || .0 || .0 || 1.0
|- class="sortbottom"
| style="text-align:center;" colspan="2"| Career
| 39 || 22 || 21.8 || .451 || .226 || .766 || 2.1 || 1.4 || .9 || .2 || 10.8

Filmography
Played in the 1997 film Shadow Conspiracy with Charlie Sheen, Linda Hamilton, Donald Sutherland and Gore Vidal.

Notes

External links
Career Stats
Johnny Newman @ The Internet Movie Database

1963 births
Living people
African-American basketball players
American expatriate basketball people in Greece
American men's basketball players
Basketball players from Virginia
Charlotte Hornets players
Cleveland Cavaliers draft picks
Cleveland Cavaliers players
Dallas Mavericks players
Denver Nuggets players
Milwaukee Bucks players
New Jersey Nets players
New York Knicks players
Panionios B.C. players
Richmond Spiders men's basketball players
Shooting guards
Small forwards
Sportspeople from Danville, Virginia
21st-century African-American people
20th-century African-American sportspeople